Gionata Boschetti ((born 7 December 1992), known professionally as Sfera Ebbasta, also called (Sfra Ebsta), is an Italian rapper and singer.

Ebbasta rose to prominence after the release of XDVR (2015), recorded with the collaboration of record producer Charlie Charles and DEACC which achieved commercial success in Italy. This success was replicated with Sfera Ebbasta (2016), Rockstar (2018) and its re-issue Popstar Edition (2018), and Famoso (2020). He was the best-selling artist in Italy in the 2010 decade and currently holds the record for most songs reaching #1 in the country (20).

Biography

First years 
Sfera was born in the Milanese town of Sesto San Giovanni, but grew up in the neighbouring town of Cinisello Balsamo. His parents separated two years after his birth, and his father died when he was only 13. He dropped out of school at the age of 14.

First songs (2011–2013)
The rapper began his musical activity by uploading videos on YouTube between 2010 and 2012 without any success. In this period he started getting into contact with producer Charlie Charles, met while trying to illegally enter in a Hip Hop TV concert in Milan. Thus, they formed the collective Billion Headz Money Gang, better known by the acronym BHMG. On 15 September 2013, he published Emergenza Mixtape Vol. 1.

XDVR (2014–2016)
Since November 2014, he has produced several pieces in collaboration with Charlie Charles  and published them on YouTube with their videos. After the release of the song Panette he began to be contacted by some record labels.

On 11 June 2015 he made his debut with the first studio album XDVR (standing for "per davvero", "for real" in English), made up by some of the singles published in the previous months, as well as other unpublished ones. Initially released as a free download, the album was reissued in a reloaded version on 23 November through Roccia Music, an independent record label of Marracash and Shablo, and distributed in the national sales circuits; in addition to the songs already present in the original, the tracklist included the unreleased XDVRMX (with Marracash and Luchè), Ciny (referring to his hometown Cinisello, of which video clip was also shot) and Trap Kings. The album received a good success in the underground musical scene and greatly increased the popularity of trap music in Italy, also receiving excellent feedback from the specialized critics; however it was also the subject of numerous criticisms as various songs spoke of life in suburban neighborhoods (mainly inspired by the street reality of his city, Cinisello Balsamo), including criminal activities and consumption of drugs such as codeine and marijuana.

On 20 January 2016 the video of the unreleased track Blunt & Sprite was published on YouTube, while during the same year Sfera Ebbasta featured in a track of the album Anarchie by the French rapper SCH, positively impressed by listening to the rapper's pieces during a stay in Italy: he also made the track Cartine Cartier, produced by Charlie Charles and DJ Kore, extracted as a promotional single of the album.

Sfera Ebbasta (2016–2017)
On 9 September 2016 the rapper published his first solo studio album, the homonymous Sfera Ebbasta, distributed by the record Universal (in collaboration with Def Jam) and anticipated by the singles BRNBQ (which received a golden record certificate for over 25,000 copies sold), Cartine Cartier and Figli di papà, the latter a platinum-certified record for having sold over 50,000 copies. In this album the rapper detached himself from the more gangsta themes of XDVR to open himself to wider topics. Supported by a promotion also at a television level, participating in broadcasts such as Matrix Chiambretti on Canale 5 and the radio program Albertino Everyday, conducted by Albertino on Radio Deejay, the album received great success in Italy, debuting at the top of the album charts, as well as entering the charts of various European countries; the album was also certified as a gold record by FIMI for having sold over 25,000 copies. Between October 2016 and March 2017, the rapper promoted the album through the Sfera Ebbasta Tour, performing in various cities of Italy.

Rockstar (2017–2018)
On 10 March 2017, Sfera Ebbasta released the single Dexter, produced by Charlie Charles and Sick Luke, as well as taking part in Charlie Charles's single Bimbi along with rappers Izi, Rkomi, Tedua and Ghali. Subsequently, the rapper performed at the TIM MTV Awards 2017 and at the Wind Music Awards 2017, during which he presented a further unreleased song, Tran Tran, published on 9 June for digital download.

On 22 September of the same year Gué Pequeno released the single Lamborghini in his album entitled Gentleman, which featured the vocal participation of Sfera Ebbasta; this single achieved good success in Italy, reaching the peak of Top Singoli, the official ranking for the most listened and sold singles in Italy.

On 3 January 2018 the rapper announced his third studio album Rockstar, produced again by Charlie Charles and released on the 19th of the same month. The album was commercialized in Italian and international editions, the latter characterized by collaborations with various artists such as Tinie Tempah, Rich the Kid and Quavo; the album debuted at the top of the FIMI Album Ranking. At the same time, all 11 tracks have conquered the top twelve positions of Top Single (with the sole exception of Ed Sheeran's Perfect single, in sixth place). Also, thanks to the success of his album, the rapper became the first Italian artist to position himself among the first hundred of the world ranking compiled by Spotify.

On 13 March 2018 the rapper, along with Charlie Charles, announced the establishment of the record label Billion Headz Music Group, while on 4 May the unpublished single Peace & Love was released, which also involved the rapper Ghali.

On 7 December 2018 the re-edition of Rockstar, subtitled Popstar Edition, is published, including a second disc containing some remixes and the unreleased tracks Popstar, Uh Ah Hey and Happy Birthday (the latter extracted as a single).

On the night of 7 to 8 December 2018, Sfera Ebbasta was due to perform in a nightclub in Corinaldo, near Ancona; during the wait for his appearance, at around 1 am, a panic induced stampede caused six deaths and dozens of injuries.

Collaborations and Famoso (2018–present) 
After Rockstar, Sfera has collaborated with lot of Italian and non rappers in some tracks, without announcing a new album.

The first appearance as a featuring is on 22 May 2020 when Italian rapper DrefGold has released his second album Elo, in which Sfera Ebbasta appears as a featuring in the single "Elegante". On 5 June the single "Miami" was released: it is the result of a collaboration with US rapper Ronny J and Argentinian rapper Khea, while a week later it was the turn of "M'Manc", a single recorded with the producer Shablo and the Neapolitan rapper Geolier.

On 26 June Italian rapper Gué Pequeno released his seventh album Mr. Fini, in which Sfera Ebbasta duets with him on the track "Immortale". Another collaboration occurs on 10 July when Mahmood released the single "Dorado", realized with Sfera Ebbasta himself and Colombian rapper Feid. Last collaboration is on 11 September, when Father son and spirit, the second studio album of the trap group FSK Satellite, is released and Sfera Ebbasta appears in the track "Soldi sulla carta".

At the beginning of October 2020 Sfera released on IG a teaser to announce his third studio album.

On the 13th of that month it announced the title, FAMO$O (Italian word for FAMOU$, with the S stylized as dollar symbol), and its tracklist, characterized for the first time ever by several important and relevant collaborations,  with names which are worldwide known as Offset, Future, Steve Aoki, Diplo and J Balvin. Curiously, the only Italian collaboration is with Marracash and Gué Pequeno in a track; the publication of the project is scheduled for 20 November 2020. Also involved in the project are some important producers as Steve Aoki, Diplo and London on da Track. Moreover, another curiosity will be represented in the last track "$€ Freestyle", because it will be the first track produced by Sfera himself.

Alongside the musical project Sfera released the documentary of the same name, exclusively on Prime Video, which shows some anecdotes of his musical growth and the making-of the new album.

On 28 October he released the first single "Bottiglie Privè", the unique which is produced by his producer Charlie Charles, who is executive producer of the entire album.

With the release of Famoso, a collaboration with the famous American fast food restaurant chain KFC has been announced.

In July 2021, his collaboration with Italian rapper Blanco titled "Mi fai impazzire" ("You drive me crazy") peaked at #1 on the Italian singles chart, giving him his 18th number one single, and at today is certified seventh platinum by FIMI.

Controversy
In January 2019, an investigation was opened against him for "instigation to the use of drugs" by the Pescara Public Prosecutor's Office, following a complaint by senators Lucio Malan and Massimo Mallegni from political party "Forza Italia".

Discography

Studio albums

Singles

As lead artist

As featured artist

Guest appearances

References

External links 

 Official website, on sferaebbasta.com.
 Sferaebbasta, on AllMusic, All Media Network.
 Sferaebbasta, on Discogs, Zink Media.
 Sferaebbasta, on MusicBraidz, MetaBrainz Foundation.

1992 births
Italian rappers
Living people
People from Cinisello Balsamo
21st-century Italian musicians
Male rappers
21st-century Italian male musicians